The Entertainments National Service Association (ENSA) was an organisation established in 1939 by Basil Dean and Leslie Henson to provide entertainment for British armed forces personnel during World War II. ENSA operated as part of the Navy, Army and Air Force Institutes. It was superseded by Combined Services Entertainment (CSE) which now operates as part of the Services Sound and Vision Corporation (SSVC).

The first big wartime variety concert organised by ENSA was broadcast by the BBC to the Empire and local networks from RAF Hendon in north London on 17 October 1939. Among the entertainers appearing on the bill were Adelaide Hall, The Western Brothers and Mantovani. A newsreel of this concert showing Hall singing "We're Going to Hang out the Washing on the Siegfried Line" accompanied by Mantovani and His Orchestra exists.

Many members of ENSA later had careers in the entertainment industry after the war, including actors Terry-Thomas, Peter Sellers and Kenneth Connor.

Tap and acrobatic dancer Vivienne Hole, stage name Vivienne Fayre, a civilian aged 19, was the only ENSA member killed in the war. On 23 January 1945 in Normandy, she was being driven between shows as a passenger aboard a truck carrying stage scenery which strayed into a minefield. She was buried with full military honours in Sittard War Cemetery.

In popular culture
Despite many extremely talented entertainers working for ENSA, the organisation was necessarily spread thin over the vast area it had to cover. Thus many entertainments were substandard, and the popular translation of the acronym ENSA was "Every Night Something Awful".

ENSA plays a modest role in the motion picture Love Story (1944) in which Margaret Lockwood stars as a concert pianist who makes an ENSA tour to North Africa and the Mediterranean region. The film Desert Mice (1959) follows the fictional escapades of an ENSA troop with Sid James assigned to the Afrika Korps.

The only known ENSA theatre to have survived in its original condition is the Garrison Theatre at Hurst Castle in the New Forest National Park. Created by servicemen in 1939, the proscenium arch still bears the badge and grenades of the Royal Artillery, and the curtains still hang from an original galvanised gas pipe. Shows are presented from time to time by the Friends of Hurst Castle.

Partial list of performers

 Avril Angers
 Helen Clare
 Kenneth Connor
 Noël Coward
 Gracie Fields
 George Formby
 Beryl Grey
 Geraldo
 Sonnie Hale
 Adelaide Hall
 Stanley Holloway
 Frankie Howerd
 Mary Lee
 Vera Lynn
 Jessie Matthews
 Laurence Olivier
 Mantovani
Lennard Pearce
 Bob and Alf Pearson
 Arthur Riscoe
 Thelma Ruby
 Peter Sellers
 Terry-Thomas
 The Western Brothers

References

External links

 SSVC website
 'Chaos Supersedes ENSA' on IMDB

Military of the United Kingdom
Organizations established in 1939
Entertainment organizations
1939 establishments in the United Kingdom
Cultural history of World War II